Thue Christiansen (25 February 1940 – 26 June 2022) was a Greenlandic teacher, visual artist, and politician. Christiansen is best known as the designer of the current flag of Greenland, which was adopted on 21 June 1985. A trained teacher, Christiansen was elected to the Inatsisartut for Siumut in 1979 when Greenland was granted home rule. He was the Greenlandic Minister of Culture and Education from 1979 until 1983.

Christiansen died on 26 June 2022, at his home in Hals, Denmark. He was 82.

References

1940 births
2022 deaths
Flag designers
Government ministers of Greenland
Greenlandic artists
Greenlandic educators
Greenlandic Inuit people
20th-century Greenlandic politicians